Agioi Anargyroi-Kamatero is a municipality in the West Athens regional unit, Attica, Greece. The seat of the municipality is the town Agioi Anargyroi.

Municipality
The municipality Agioi Anargyroi-Kamatero was formed at the 2011 local government reform by the merger of the following 2 former municipalities, that became municipal units:
Agioi Anargyroi
Kamatero

The municipality has an area of 9.15 km2.

References

Municipalities of Attica
Populated places in West Athens (regional unit)